Middle Harbor Shoreline Park (MHSP) is located on San Francisco Bay and the Port of Oakland entrance channel, west of downtown Oakland, California. It is owned and operated by the Port of Oakland. The park entrance is at the intersection of 7th Street and Middle Harbor Road. It is open seven days a week from 8 a.m. to dusk.

History
The park is primarily on land that was the former site of the Oakland Naval Supply Depot  (1940−1998), which was an important supply base for the Pacific Fleet of the U. S. Navy throughout World War II.  The Naval Supply Depot closed in 1998, and the  facility was transferred to the Port of Oakland, which still owns it.

The section adjacent to the Port of Oakland, which includes Port View Park, was originally part of the Oakland Long Wharf or Oakland Pier−Mole, which was the massive western terminus of the Southern Pacific Railroad into San Francisco Bay. The interlocking tower from the railroad's pier has been moved and partially restored as a small commemorative museum.

A  area was redeveloped for the park from 2002 to 2004. Redevelopment of the land included restoration of beaches and creation of a lagoon. The park was opened to the public on September 18, 2004.

Features
 There is an amphitheater overlooking San Francisco Bay where live entertainment performs.
 The Chappell R. Hayes Memorial Observation Tower, named to honor the West Oakland leader, offers good views of the Oakland Estuary and the Port's shipping activities.
 Interpretive signs throughout the park present the history of the site, the environmental resources here and the adjacent maritime activities.
 A viewing area for observing the super-Panamax cranes in operation at the adjacent Hanjin Terminal.

Accessibility
The following facilities are wheelchair accessible:
 Parking lots
 Restrooms
 Drinking fountains
 Picnic sites
 Port View Park
 Observation Tower
 Viewing area at Western Pacific Mole

Rules
 The park is open from 8:00 a.m. to dusk 7 days a week, all year. It is closed from dusk to dawn, except for special events authorized by Park Use Permit.
 The park will only be closed to the public during special events. Those are conducted no more than 3 times per year, and advance notification is posted.
 Dogs are not allowed within the park, except that Service Dogs ON-LEASH ONLY are permitted on trails and parkland areas (Oakland Municipal Code).

Gallery

References

External links
 East Bay Regional Parks District: official Middle Harbor Shoreline Park website
Map: 

Parks in Oakland, California
East Bay Regional Park District
San Francisco Bay
San Francisco Bay Trail
Parks in Alameda County, California